Zboriv is a town in Ternopil Raion of Ternopil Oblast, west Ukraine. It is located in the historical region of Galicia. Local government is administered by Zboriv town council. Zboriv hosts the administration of Zboriv urban hromada, one of the hromadas of Ukraine. Population: 

History
It was mentioned for the first time in a document from 1166. In 1241, during the Mongol invasion of Europe, it was ransacked and destroyed. In 1639, Zboriv was granted city rights. Its present name comes from a noble Polish family of Zborowscy. Ten years later, Zboriv was besieged by the Tartar-Cossack armies during the Khmelnytsky Uprising.

In 1913, Zboriv had about 6000 inhabitants, including 2400 Ukrainians, 1300 Poles and 2300 Jews. During World War I, the town's vicinity was the site of heavy fighting between the Czechoslovak legionnaires and the Austrian Army (June 1917, Battle of Zborov). After the Polish-Ukrainian war 1918-1919, it became part of Poland and was the seat of a powiat of the Tarnopol Voivodeship.

In 1941, during World War II, Zboriv was the site of a mass murder conducted by Germans of the Einsatzgruppen, along with local Ukrainians. Information about the Jewish community destroyed during the Holocaust can be found in a Yizkor book published by Jews who fled Zborow and survived the Holocaust.

The town was completely destroyed in the summer of 1944 due to the Soviet offensive. Under Soviet rule (1944–1991), Zboriv was rebuilt and redeveloped. Construction plant and a small food processing factory were built in the 1960s. A significant part of the local budget relied on agriculture and governmental subsidies. The state farm in Zboriv was one of the best in the region. In the 1980s, the town became the object of serious governmental investments. Among these few new town improvements were built, like:  cinema, agricultural market, new secondary school, waterbike lake station, football stadium, a city hall and a culture hall.

After the collapse of the Soviet Union, the local economy experienced a deep downturn. During the 1990s (until present time) as a result of economic decline many working-age people emigrated - mostly as a low-skilled labourers in Western Europe or Russia. Nowadays, in spite of the unfavorable conditions, the younger generation is less likely to quit and prefer to commute daily to work in the larger cities Ternopil and Lviv, which offer wider job opportunities.

Until 18 July 2020, Zboriv was the administrative center of Zboriv Raion. The raion was abolished in July 2020 as part of the administrative reform of Ukraine, which reduced the number of raions of Ternopil Oblast to three. The area of Zboriv Raion was merged into Ternopil Raion.

Gallery

Notable people
 Raphael Zaborovsky (1677–1747), Russian Orthodox bishop
 Mykola Skorodynskyi (1751–1805), Ukrainian Greek Catholic hierarch
 Milena Rudnytska (1892–1976), Ukrainian educator, women's activist, politician and writer
 Roman Pokora (1948–2021), Ukrainian football player
 Volodymyr Shandra (born 1963), Ukrainian politician and former Governor of Kyiv Oblast
 Ihor Kurylo (born 1993), Ukrainian football player
 Sviatoslav Dziadykevych (born 1995), Ukrainian football player
 Ivan Kohut (born 1998), Ukrainian football player
 Mykola Kohut (born 1998), Ukrainian football player

See also
 Battle of Zboriv (1649)
 Treaty of Zboriv (1649)
 Battle of Zboriv (1917)
 Einsatzgruppen

References

External links 
 weather.in.ua

 
Cities in Ternopil Oblast
Tarnopol Voivodeship
Towns of district significance in Ukraine
Strypa
Holocaust locations in Ukraine